The Autódromo de Buenos Aires Oscar y Juan Gálvez is a 45,000 capacity motor racing circuit in Buenos Aires, Argentina built in 1952 under president Juan Perón, named Autódromo 17 de Octubre after the date of Loyalty Day until Perón's overthrow. It was later renamed after Argentinian racing driver brothers, Juan Gálvez (1916–1963) and Oscar Alfredo Gálvez (1913–1989).

Description
The circuit is located in a park in the southern part of the city and is situated on flat lands surrounded by large grandstands, giving most spectators an excellent view area of the whole circuit. The circuit is notable for the large number of alternative layouts to accommodate different forms of racing, with some races run without the twisty infield section, reducing lap times significantly.

The 1000 km Buenos Aires sports car event used the Autódromo as well as sections of highway situated near the track from 1954 to 1960.  The 1000 km event would return again from 1970 to 1972, but using just the Autódromo section.

Going through the section, the cars were flat out for 40 seconds. The Argentine Grand Prix was dropped from the 1982 calendar because of Argentina's invasion of the Falkland Islands and Carlos Reutemann's sudden retirement after the 1982 Brazilian Grand Prix. The twisty No.6 configuration, though using S de Senna instead of Tobogán, was used from 1995–1998, but that version of the circuit was not popular with Formula One. After the 1998 race, there was no money for the race to be held and it was dropped.

The Buenos Aires Grand Prix was held in the Autódromo from 1952 to 2009.

Names
1952–1955: Autódromo 17 de Octubre
1955 – mid-1960s: Autódromo Municipal Ciudad de Buenos Aires
Mid-1960s – 1989: Autódromo Municipal del Parque Almirante Brown de la Ciudad de Buenos Aires
1989–2008: Autódromo Oscar Alfredo Gálvez
2008–present: Autódromo Oscar y Juan Gálvez

Circuits

 Layout usage
 1952–1958: Buenos Aires Grand Prix (La Temporada) – Formula Libre (circuits: No.4, 1952 – No.2, 1953–1958)
 –: Argentine Grand Prix – Formula 1 (circuits: No.2, 1953–60 – No.9, 1971–73 – No.15, 1974–81 – No.6, 1995–98)
 1964–1978: Buenos Aires Grand Prix – Formula 2, Formula 3, Formula Junior (circuits: No.4 1964, No.15 1966–68, No.12 1978)
 1983–1985: Buenos Aires Grand Prix – Formula 2 Codasur (circuit No.4)
 1954–1960 / 1970–1972: 1000 km of Buenos Aires sports car series Grand Prix (1952 circuit No.1 plus various street layouts)
 1961–1999: Argentine motorcycle Grand Prix (circuit No.6; except for 1982, circuit No.8)

Fatal accidents

Events

 Current
 February: TC2000 200 km de Buenos Aires, Formula Nacional Argentina
 March: Top Race V6

 Former

 200 Miles of Buenos Aires (1970)
 Campeonato Sudamericano de GT (2013)
 Copa Truck (2018)
 F4 Argentina Championship (2021)
 Formula 3 Sudamericana Buenos Aires Grand Prix (1952–1955, 1957–1959, 1964, 1966–1968, 1978, 1983, 1985, 1987, 1989–1999, 2001, 2006, 2008–2009)
 Formula One Argentine Grand Prix (1953–1958, 1960, 1972–1975, 1977–1981, 1995–1998)
 Formula Truck (2009–2011)
 Grand Prix motorcycle racing Argentine motorcycle Grand Prix (1961–1963, 1981–1982, 1987, 1994–1995, 1998–1999)
 Porsche Cup Brasil (2011, 2017)
 Porsche GT3 Cup Trophy Argentina (2018–2019)
 South American Super Touring Car Championship (1997–2001)
 Stock Car Brasil (2005–2007, 2017)
 TCR South America Touring Car Championship (2021–2022)
 Turismo Carretera (1952–1955, 1958–1970, 1974–1979, 1981–2014, 2017–2018, 2020–2021)
 Turismo Nacional (1963–1997, 2000–2003, 2017, 2021–2022)
 World Sportscar Championship 1000 km Buenos Aires (1954–1958, 1960, 1971–1972)

Lap records 

The official race lap records at the Autódromo Oscar y Juan Gálvez are listed as:

Concerts
The 2007, 2008, 2010 and 2011 Creamfields editions were held in the track, The Chemical Brothers, Carl Cox, John Digweed, LCD Soundsystem, James Zabiela, 2 Many DJs, Tiefschwarz, Steve Lawler, Satoshi Tomiie, Booka Shade, Deadmau5, David Guetta, Calvin Harris, among others playing here.

Notes

References

External links

Official site  
 Aerial photo (Google Maps)

Argentine Grand Prix
 
Oscar y Juan Galvez
Oscar y Juan Galvez
Sport in Buenos Aires
Sports venues in Buenos Aires
Sports venues completed in 1952
Motorsport venues in Buenos Aires